Faithfulness is the concept of unfailingly remaining loyal to someone or something, and putting that loyalty into consistent practice regardless of extenuating circumstances. It may be exhibited by a husband or wife who does not engage in sexual relationships outside of the marriage. It can also mean keeping one's promises no matter the prevailing circumstances, such as certain communities of monks who take a vow of silence. Literally, it is the state of being full of faith in the sense of steady devotion to a person, thing or concept.

Etymology 
Its etymology is distantly related to that of fidelity; indeed, in modern electronic devices, a machine with high "fidelity" is considered "faithful" to its source material. Similarly, a spouse who, inside a sexually exclusive relationship, has sexual relations outside of marriage could be considered as being "unfaithful" as having committed "infidelity".

Religions 
Sexual faithfulness within a marriage is a required tenet in Christianity, being called one of the four pillars of marriage. It is also required in Jewish marriage, and Islam., although these requirements are unimportant since it is also required by the act of marriage generally in most cultures that exist today.

See also
Marriage

References

Sociology of the family
Philosophy of love
Ethical principles
Fruit of the Holy Spirit